Charlton is a small village and civil parish north-west of Andover. Due to the expansion of Andover in recent years the two settlements are now effectively contiguous. Charlton is separated from Andover by way of Charlton Park and Anton Lakes.  This provides an effective natural gap.   As of 2005, the village has a population of 2,053 people.

History 
In 1892 Charlton was a moderately sized rural settlement, with a school, smithy, two farms, a Methodist chapel, and two pubs.

By 1969 the Village had undergone some expansion, St Thomas' Church was built and in-fill houses had been added. Andover had expanded past the railway line and the gap between Charlton and it was now almost non-existent.

For Charlton itself, the greatest growth in its history came in the late 1970s and 80s, with very large development primarily to the west of Hatherden Road. The new houses were in a suburban style, extinguishing most of the remaining rural character.

More development took place after 2017, to the east of the historic centre.

Today there are some reminders of Charlton's rural past; there are at-least eight thatched buildings (including part of the Royal Oak) and several other historic buildings.

Charlton Lakeside 
There are also a number of other sporting venues to suit everyone of all ages provided by Charlton Leisure centre. These include:

6 Football pitches (1 floodlit)
2 Cricket pitches
6 Lane all weather floodlit running track
1 Artificial turf pitch (floodlit)
18 hole pitch and putt course
18 hole adventure golf course
Children's playground
Boating lake
Fishing lake
BMX Track

Sporting events 
Test Valley Cycle Tour
The RPM Challenge Bike Ride Of The Day
Andover RFC
Andover Parkrun - a weekly, free 5k run around Charlton Playing Fields

St. Thomas' Community Hall 
Along with all the sporting facilities in the village, the local church also provides many services to the community.

The Royal Oak 
Like any traditional English village, the Royal Oak is Charlton's local pub, providing a valuable service to many of the locals. The pub also has various pool, dart and football teams as well as a very popular weekly quiz night.

Shops in Charlton 
There is a Tesco mini-market which took over from the One Stop chain in 2007. This unit was historically an independent newsagent and convenience store known as Charlton News, owned by the Patel family during the 1970s and 80s.

The other shop in the village is Charlton Premier Shop - a local produce and mini-market. Previously Behind The Bikeshed - and originally the village Post Office and Spar Shop.

References

External links

Sports
Lakeside

Villages in Hampshire
Test Valley